A specialist law enforcement agency is a law enforcement agency which specialises in the types of laws it enforces, or types of activities it undertakes, or geography it enforces laws in, or these in combination.

The specialisation may be imposed voluntarily by policy, consensus with other agencies, or logistical constraints, or it could be imposed legally by law and jurisdiction, or it is result of the historical evolution of the agency, or combinations thereof.

For example, some agencies only enforce laws related to taxation or customs.  Other agencies can only operate in certain areas, for example government-occupied buildings and land, or on waterways.  Some agencies have otherwise unrestricted jurisdiction, but specialise in certain types of operations, for example highway patrols.

Specialities can include:
 For example, United States Department of Veterans Affairs Police.
 For example, United States Border Patrol.
 For example, National Oceanic and Atmospheric Administration Fisheries Office of Law Enforcement.
 For example, United States Park Police.
 For example, United States Postal Inspection Service.
 For example, Polizei beim Deutschen Bundestag.
 For example, California Highway Patrol.
 For example, Australian Customs Service.
 For example, Independent Commission Against Corruption (New South Wales).
 For example, Australian Taxation Office.
 For example, Canadian Pacific Railway Police Service.
 For example, Iowa Department of Transportation Motor Vehicle Enforcement Agency.
 For example, Special Protection Group.
 For example, Serious Fraud Office (UK).
 For example, Central Reserve Police Force.
 For example, Diplomatic Security Service.
 For example, Indian Coast Guard.

See Specialist law enforcement agencies for a list of specialist agencies.

See also
Law enforcement organization

 
Law enforcement